Hiantoporidae is a family of bryozoans belonging to the order Cheilostomatida.

Genera:
 Hiantopora MacGillivray, 1887
 Tremopora Ortmann, 1890

References

Cheilostomatida